The Bhopal–Ujjain Passenger is a passenger train of the Indian Railways, which runs between Bhopal Junction railway station of Bhopal, the capital city of Madhya Pradesh and Ujjain Junction railway station of Ujjain, the holy city of Central Indian state Madhya Pradesh.

History 

In March 2017, ISIS planned low intensity explosion in Bhopal-Ujjain passenger when train was Jabri railway station, 80 km before Bhopal injuring 10 passenger in the train.

Arrival and departure
Train no.59320 departs from Bhopal, daily at 06:30 hrs., reaching Ujjain the same day at 11:00 hrs.
Train no.59319 departs from Ujjain daily at 00:00 hrs. from platform no.3 reaching Bhopal the next day at 0000  hrs.

Route and halts
The important halts of the train are:
Bhopal Junction,
Bhopal Bairagarh,
Shujalpur,
Maksi,
Tarana,
Ujjain Pingleshwar, and
Ujjain Junction.

Coach composite
The train consists of 18 coaches:
 1 First Class
 4 Sleeper coaches
 10 Unreserved
 1 Ladies/Handicapped
 2 Luggage/Brake van

Average speed and frequency
The train runs with an average speed of 35 km/h. The train runs on a daily basis.

Loco link
The train is hauled by WAP5 or WAP4 Electric engine.

Rake maintenance and sharing
The train is maintained by the Bhopal Coaching Depot. The same rake is used for five trains, which are Indore–Chhindwara Panchvalley Express, Indore–Maksi Passenger, Indore–Ujjain Passenger, Bhopal–Indore Passenger and Bhopal–Bina Passenger for one way which is altered by the second rake on the other way.

See also
Avantika Express
Indore Junction
Bhopal Junction
2017 Bhopal–Ujjain Passenger train bombing

References

External links
indore360.com

Transport in Bhopal
Railway services introduced in 1999
Rail transport in Madhya Pradesh
Transport in Ujjain
Slow and fast passenger trains in India